Jefferson is an unincorporated community in Montgomery County, Kansas, United States.

History
Jefferson was laid out in 1886 when the railroad was extended to that point. It was named for Albert Jefferson Broadbent, the original owner of the town site.

A post office was opened in Jefferson in 1888, and remained in operation until it was discontinued in 1954.

References

Further reading

External links
 Montgomery County maps: Current, Historic, KDOT

Unincorporated communities in Montgomery County, Kansas
Unincorporated communities in Kansas